Depressaria floridella is a moth of the family Depressariidae. It is found in Greece, Turkey and Israel.

References

External links
lepiforum.de

Moths described in 1864
Depressaria
Moths of Europe
Moths of Asia